Bishop of (the) South(ern) (Region) may refer to:

 Bishop of the Southern Region, an assistant bishop in the Anglican Diocese of Sydney
 Bishop of the Southern Region, an assistant bishop in the Anglican Diocese of Brisbane
 Bishop of the Southern Region, an assistant bishop in the Anglican Diocese of Melbourne
 Bishop of the Southern Region, an assistant bishop in the Anglican Diocese of Perth